The 2019 Grand Prix Cycliste de Québec was a road cycling one-day race that took place on 13 September 2019 in Canada. It was the 10th edition of Grand Prix Cycliste de Québec and the 35th event of the 2019 UCI World Tour. Australian rider Michael Matthews of  won the race for the second year in a row and successfully defended his title.

Teams
Twenty-one teams, which consisted of all eighteen UCI WorldTour teams, two UCI Professional Continental teams, and one national team, participated in the race. Of the starting peloton of 146 riders, only 128 riders finished the race.

UCI WorldTeams

 
 
 
 
 
 
 
 
 
 
 
 
 
 
 
 
 
 

UCI Professional Continental teams

 
 

National teams

 Canada

Results

References

Grand Prix Cycliste de Québec
Grand Prix Cycliste de Québec
Grand Prix Cycliste de Québec
Grand Prix Cycliste de Québec